Martin Cooke is a baritone singer of opera and classical music. He attended St Aloysius' College, Sydney, New South Wales, Australia.

External links
 Detailed biography and CV

Australian operatic baritones
Year of birth missing (living people)
Living people
People educated at St Aloysius' College (Sydney)
Place of birth missing (living people)
Sydney Conservatorium of Music alumni
21st-century Australian male opera singers